Jarun Burapharat Stadium is a multi-purpose venue in Bangkok , Thailand. It hosted matches of PTT F.C. in the 2008 Thailand League Division 1. In 2017, it is used for occasional music concerts such as the "Chang Music Connection Musictropolis".

Multi-purpose stadiums in Thailand
Sports venues in Bangkok